In computing, ASPI (Advanced SCSI Programming Interface) is an Adaptec-developed programming interface which standardizes communication on a computer bus between a SCSI driver module on the one hand and SCSI (and ATAPI) peripherals on the other.

ASPI structure 
The ASPI manager software provides an interface between ASPI modules (device drivers or applications with direct SCSI support), a SCSI host adapter, and SCSI devices connected to the host adapter. The ASPI manager is specific to the host adapter and operating system; its primary role is to abstract the host adapter specifics and provide a generic software interface to SCSI devices.

On Windows 9x and Windows NT, the ASPI manager is generic and relies on the services of SCSI miniport drivers. On those systems, the ASPI interface is designed for applications which require SCSI pass-through functionality (such as CD-ROM burning software).

The primary operations supported by ASPI are discovery of host adapters and attached devices, and submitting SCSI commands to devices via SRBs (SCSI Request Blocks). ASPI supports concurrent execution of SCSI commands.

History 

Originally inspired by a driver architecture developed by Douglas W. Goodall for Ampro Computers in 1983, ASPI was developed by Adaptec around 1990. It was initially designed to support DOS, OS/2, Windows 3.x, and Novell NetWare. It was originally written to support SCSI devices; support for ATAPI devices was added later. Most other SCSI host adapter vendors (for example BusLogic, DPT, AMI, Future Domain, DTC) shipped their own ASPI managers with their hardware.

Adaptec also developed generic SCSI disk and CD-ROM drivers for DOS (ASPICD.SYS and ASPIDISK.SYS).

Microsoft licensed the interface for use with Windows 9x series. At the same time Microsoft developed SCSI Pass Through Interface (SPTI), an in-house substitute that worked on the NT platform. Microsoft did not include ASPI in Windows 2000/XP, in favor of its own SPTI. Users may still download ASPI from Adaptec. A number of CD/DVD applications also continue to offer their own implementations of ASPI layer.

To support USB drives under DOS, Panasonic developed a universal ASPI driver (USBASPI.SYS) that bypasses the lack of native USB support by DOS.

Driver 
ASPI was provided by the following drivers.

See also 
 SCSI Pass-Through Direct (SPTD)
 SCSI Pass Through Interface (SPTI)

References 

Application programming interfaces
SCSI
AT Attachment
Device drivers